The 2014–15 Ligue Nationale du football Amateur is the fifth season of the league under its current title and fifth season under its current league division format. A total of 48 teams will be contesting the league. The league is scheduled to start on September 16, 2014.

Stadiums and locations

League table

Groupe Est

Groupe Centre

Groupe Ouest

References

Ligue Nationale du Football Amateur seasons
3
Algeria